Tasmaniacris is a genus of short-horned grasshoppers in the family Acrididae. There is one described species in Tasmaniacris, T. tasmaniensis, found in Tasmania.

References

External links

 

Acrididae